Marvin Sapp is the debut album by Marvin Sapp released via Word Records.

Track listing

References

1996 debut albums
Marvin Sapp albums